Legacy Effects, LLC is an American special effects studio specializing in creature design, prosthetic makeup, animatronics, and specialty suits.

History
Founding partners Lindsay Macgowan, Shane Mahan, John Rosengrant, and Alan Scott supervised projects at Stan Winston Studio for over 20 years before Winston’s death in 2008. After his death they formed their own company, Legacy Effects, with their first film being 2012 (2009).

Their first film outside of the United States was the Indian film Enthiran (2010), which was used for prosthetic makeup and animatronics.

Special effects work
The feature films Legacy Effects has contributed practical effects to include Avatar, Iron Man 2, Iron Man 3, The Avengers, Avengers: Age of Ultron, Alice in Wonderland, Snow White and the Huntsman, Life of Pi, Thor, RoboCop, Pacific Rim, Enthiran, 2.0 and X-Men: Days of Future Past. Legacy Effects also provided effects for films in the Terminator and Jurassic Park franchises, Terminator Genisys and Jurassic World.

Legacy contributed character design for films including Godzilla, John Carter, The Avengers, The Amazing Spider-Man, Cowboys & Aliens, The Hunger Games and Avatar.

Their work has garnered Best Visual Effects Academy Award nominations for Real Steel and Iron Man.

Legacy Effects has created effects for television shows such as Agents of S.H.I.E.L.D., Colony, Agent Carter, Grey's Anatomy and The Big Bang Theory, and contributed work to over 900 commercials. Notable examples of their commercial work include Destiny, Halo, The Aflac Duck, Maxwell the Geico Pig, The KIA Hamsters, and the Jack Links Sasquatch campaigns.

iMut8r app
Legacy created the iMut8r app, first released in October 2009. A popular Halloween-themed photo manipulation app, iMut8r was named the iPhone App of the Week by Apple October 20, 2010. It is still regularly updated with new features.

Comic-Con events
Legacy Effects gained attention for a 9'9" (2.97m) cosplay robot that was unveiled at the 2013 San Diego Comic-Con. Created through a partnership between Wired magazine, YouTube and Stan Winston School, the robot was built by Legacy over a period of 24 days and interacted with Comic-Con attendees throughout the four-day event, operated by a combination of suit performer and radio controlled animatronics.

For Comic-Con 2014, Legacy designed and built a 13'6" (4.11m) tall animatronic creature called Bodock the Giant Creature. Created through a partnership with Stan Winston School, Stratasys, and Wired magazine, the Giant Creature involved two separate animatronic characters and nine puppeteers. A majority of the hard surfaces were 3D printed by Stratasys. 
The goal of both events was to celebrate and promote practical special effects.

Filmography

References

External links

Special effects companies